Araruna is the name of several municipalities of Brazil:

Araruna, Paraíba
Araruna, Paraná